Jean Mesqui, (born 27 May 1952 in Paris) is an engineer, researcher in castle studies, and specialist in the bridges of France.

Biography 
Jean Antoine Marie Joseph Mesqui was born on 27 May 1952, in the 16th arrondissement of Paris.

He studied at the École polytechnique in Paris, and obtained a doctor of letters.

He was president of the Société des Autoroutes Paris-Normandie and the Société Française d'Archéologie. In 2016–2017, he chaired the Association des sociétés françaises d'autoroutes.

As well as his career as an engineer, Mesqui pursued research on built heritage.

Jean Mesqui is an internationally renowned castellologist. He specialises in the study of the most emblematic castles of France and the Middle East. He is also considered a specialist in bridges, in particular those of the Middle Ages.

Jean Mesqui has written several books on medieval fortified architecture, the history of bridges and roads, and numerous articles.

See also
International Castle Research Society

References

External links 
 

Officiers of the Légion d'honneur
Castellologists
Corps des ponts
École Polytechnique alumni
21st-century French historians
20th-century French historians
1952 births
Living people